
Gmina Kozłów is a rural gmina (administrative district) in Miechów County, Lesser Poland Voivodeship, in southern Poland.

Villages
Gmina Kozłów contains the villages and settlements of Bogdanów, Bryzdzyn, Kamionka, Karczowice, Kępie, Kozłów, Marcinowice, Przybysławice, Przysieka, Rogów, Wierzbica and Wolica.

Neighbouring gminas
Gmina Kozłów is bordered by the gminas of Charsznica, Książ Wielki, Sędziszów, Wodzisław and Żarnowiec.

References
Polish official population figures 2006

Kozlow
Miechów County